Oanob Dam is a dam outside Rehoboth, Hardap Region, Namibia. Located  outside Rehoboth, it dams the Oanob River and provides the town with a majority of its water.

References

Dams in Namibia
Rehoboth, Namibia
Dams completed in 1990
Buildings and structures in Hardap Region
1990 in Namibia